Máximo Pellegrino (born 6 May 1977) is an Argentine former field hockey player who competed in the 2000 Summer Olympics.

References

External links

1977 births
Living people
Argentine male field hockey players
Olympic field hockey players of Argentina
Field hockey players at the 2000 Summer Olympics